Rüegg is a Swiss surname:

 Annelise Rüegg (1879–1934), Swiss pacifist and writer
 Anny Rüegg (born 1912), a Swiss alpine skier
 Dominique Rüegg (born 1996), Swiss ice hockey player
 Ivo Rüegg (born 1971), a Swiss bobsledder
 Mathias Rüegg (born 1952), a Swiss musician
 Markus Rüegg (born 1959), a Swiss neurobiologist
 Max Rüegg, a Swiss bobsledder
 Ralph Rüegg (born 1973), a Swiss bobsledder
 Tony Rüegg, a Swiss bobsledder
 Yvonne Rüegg (born 1938), a Swiss alpine skier
 Lukas Rüegg (born 1996), Swiss cyclist
 Timon Rüegg (born 1996), Swiss cyclist

Swiss-German surnames